Drew Levin is chairman and chief executive of TMC Entertainment. Levin worked as film and television producer, executive producer and writer. As executive producer, he has been a part of over 3,000 hours of critically acclaimed reality-based, documentary and dramatic television series and specials, movies-of-the-week, mini-series, game shows, children's programming and live events in the US and internationally.

Some of Levin's executive producer credits include the Emmy award winning PBS series, "Future Quest", "Walking the Bible: A Journey by Land Through the Five Books of Moses", "Hollywood Stuntmakers", and "Total Recall 2070". Levin has worked on productions with PBS, Discovery Networks, MTV, TLC, CBS, BBC, Fox Family Channel and ABC. In 2008, Levin was convicted of financial crimes involving inflating the value of his company and sentenced to 66 months in prison.

Executive producer and producer credits - partial

Executive producer
 Walking the Bible: A Journey By Land Through the Five Books of Moses written by Bruce Feiler
 Call of the Wild (TV Series)
 Destination: Style (TV Series)
 Earthquake in New York (TV Movie)
 Future Quest (TV Series)
 Hollywood FX Masters (TV Series)
 Hollywood Stuntmakers (TV Series)
 Top of the Pops (TV Series)
 Total Recall 2070 (TV Series)
 Route to Christianity (2007) (TV MiniSeries)

Producer
 International British Record Industry Awards (TV Special)
 Strange Universe: Aliens Are Proof
 Shadow Theater

Writer Credits - Partial 
 Living With Fran
 Rock Me Baby
 Home Improvement

References

External links
 
 Drew Levin at The New York Times
 Drew Levin  at Gracenote

Living people
American entertainment industry businesspeople
Year of birth missing (living people)